The tawny-shouldered blackbird (Agelaius humeralis) is a species of bird in the family Icteridae. It is found in Cuba and Hispaniola (split between the Dominican Republic and Haiti). It is a vagrant in the United States (to the Florida Keys).

Description

The patch may not be visible when the wings are folded.

Taxonomy
Two subspecies are described:
 A. h. humeralis – (Vigors, 1827): nominate, found in Cuba and Hispaniola
 A. h. scopulus – Garrido, 1970: found on Cayo Cantiles (east of Isla de la Juventud off southwestern Cuba)

Breeding
They breed from April to August, laying 3–4 greenish-white eggs spotted with brown in a cup-shaped nest that is lined with soft materials and placed in a tree.

Diet and habitat
Tawny-shouldered blackbirds eat insects, seeds, nectar, fruit, and small lizards. Its natural habitats are subtropical or tropical dry shrubland, pastureland, and heavily degraded former forest.

References

External links

 
 
 
 
 
 

tawny-shouldered blackbird
Endemic birds of the Caribbean
Birds of Hispaniola
Birds of Cuba
Birds of the Dominican Republic
Birds of Haiti
tawny-shouldered blackbird
Taxonomy articles created by Polbot